Rajesh B Lakhoni is the CMD of Tamil Nadu Electricity Board and TANGEDCO, and chairman of TANTRANSCO in place of Pankaj Kumar Bansal, changed from the position of  Principal Secretary/Commissioner of Archives and Historical Research Department. He was previously the Principal Secretary to Government, Housing and Urban Development Department.
An IAS officer who formerly acted as the collector of Theni district and then he was changed to Kanyakumari district to seek good acts for the district after the Tsunami attack. He replaced M P Vijayakumar to take up the position of Corporation Commissioner in Chennai.

He was the chief electoral officer for Tamil Nadu state between 2015 and 2018.

References 

 Rajesh Lakhoni takes over as Corporation Commissioner
 Corporation of Chennai

Living people
Municipal Commissioners of India
Government of Chennai
Indian Administrative Service officers
Year of birth missing (living people)